Montgomery Township is the name of three places in the U.S. state of Pennsylvania:

Montgomery Township, Franklin County, Pennsylvania
Montgomery Township, Indiana County, Pennsylvania
Montgomery Township, Montgomery County, Pennsylvania

See also
Montgomery, Pennsylvania (disambiguation)

Pennsylvania township disambiguation pages